The 2009–10 2. Bundesliga was the 36th season of the 2. Bundesliga, the second tier of Germany's football league. The season began on 7 August 2009 and ended on 9 May 2010. A winter break was held between 21 December 2009 and 14 January 2010, though the period has been reduced from six to three weeks.

Teams
2008–09 2. Bundesliga champions SC Freiburg and runners-up 1. FSV Mainz 05 were promoted to the 2009–10 Bundesliga. They were replaced by Karlsruher SC and Arminia Bielefeld, who finished 17th and 18th respectively in the 2008–09 Bundesliga season.

FC Ingolstadt 04 and SV Wehen-Wiesbaden were relegated to the 2009–10 3. Liga following the 2008–09 season. They were replaced by 2008–09 3. Liga champions 1. FC Union Berlin and runners-up Fortuna Düsseldorf.

Two further spots were available through relegation/promotion play-offs. 1. FC Nürnberg gained promotion to the Bundesliga by beating Bundesliga side FC Energie Cottbus 5–0 on aggregate in the Bundesliga play-off, sending the team from the Eastern part of Germany to the second tier of German football. At the bottom end of the table, VfL Osnabrück lost both of their play-off matches against 3. Liga side SC Paderborn 07 and thus were relegated to the 2009–10 3. Liga.

Stadiums and locations
Several teams moved to different grounds for the 2009–10 season; Alemannia Aachen and Augsburg were relocating to new stadia, replacing their old structures, while FSV Frankfurt and Union Berlin returned to their original home grounds which had undergone renovation.

Personnel and sponsorship

Managerial changes

League table

Results

Relegation play-offs

The 16th-placed Hansa Rostock faced the third-placed 3. Liga team FC Ingolstadt for a two-legged play-off. FC Ingolstadt, as the winner on aggregated score after both matches earned a spot in the 2010–11 2. Bundesliga. The matches took place on 14 and 17 May, with the 3. Liga club playing at home first.

Hansa Rostock was relegated to 3. Liga and Ingolstadt was promoted to 2. Bundesliga for the 2010–11 season.

Statistics

Top goalscorersSource: kicker magazine23 goals
 Michael Thurk (FC Augsburg)20 goals
 Marius Ebbers (FC St. Pauli)15 goals
 Erik Jendrišek (1. FC Kaiserslautern) Christopher Nöthe (Greuther Fürth) Mahir Sağlık (SC Paderborn)14 goals
 Benjamin Auer (Alemannia Aachen)13 goals
 Martin Harnik (Fortuna Düsseldorf)12 goals
 Sami Allagui (Greuther Fürth) Giovanni Federico (Arminia Bielefeld) Emil Jula (Energie Cottbus)Top assistantsSource: kicker magazine12 assists
 Giovanni Federico (Arminia Bielefeld) Emil Jula (Energie Cottbus) Christian Tiffert (MSV Duisburg)11 assists
 Alexander Bugera (1. FC Kaiserslautern) Ibrahima Traoré (FC Augsburg)10 assists
 Marco Christ (Fortuna Düsseldorf) Deniz Naki (FC St. Pauli)9 assists
 Sami Allagui (Greuther Fürth) Marius Ebbers (FC St. Pauli) Jürgen Gjasula (FSV Frankfurt) Marcel Ndjeng (FC Augsburg) Mahir Sağlık (SC Paderborn)''

References

External links
 Official Bundesliga site  
 2. Bundesliga @ DFB 
 kicker.de 

2. Bundesliga seasons
2009–10 in German football leagues
Germany